The 2023 Formula Regional European Championship by Alpine is a planned multi-event, Formula Regional open-wheel single seater motor racing championship to be held across Europe. The championship will feature a mix of professional and amateur drivers, competing in Formula Regional cars that conform to the FIA Formula Regional regulations for the championship. This will be the fifth season of the championship and the third after a merger with Formula Renault Eurocup which resulted to the change of the engine supplier to Alpine.

Teams and drivers 
Twelve teams were pre-selected by the championship organizers on 2 December 2022.

Team changes 
FA Racing by MP announced their departure from the championship in October 2022. The entry would be taken over by French team Saintéloc Racing.

Driver changes 
Reigning team champions Prema Racing renewed their line-up completely, as all their 2022 full-time drivers are promoted to Formula 3, with champion Dino Beganovic and Paul Aron staying with the Italian team and Sebastian Montoya joining Hitech Pulse-Eight. Replacing them will be the 2022 Italian F4 and ADAC F4 champion Andrea Kimi Antonelli, Rafael Câmara and third-year FRECA driver Lorenzo Fluxá. All three raced for Prema's partner team Mumbai Falcons in the 2023 Formula Regional Middle East Championship, with Antonelli taking the title.

Vice-champion team R-ace GP recruited Tim Tramnitz, who departs Trident after coming 15th with the team in his debut season. He replaces Lorenzo Fluxá, who joined Prema Racing. The team signed another second-year driver in Matías Zagazeta, who failed to score points in his rookie year with G4 Racing, to replace Gabriel Bortoleto, who graduated to F3 with Trident. Their lineup will be completed by Martinius Stenshorne, who made appearances in four different Formula 4 series in 2022, with a seventh in the Italian Championship as his best result.

2022 Formula 4 UAE and 2023 Formula Regional Oceania champion Charlie Wurz joins ART Grand Prix, replacing Gabriele Minì, who graduates to FIA Formula 3 with Hitech Pulse-Eight. They also signed Sauber Academy driver Marcus Amand, who graduates from Formula 4, to replace Esteban Masson.

Van Amersfoort Racing replaced Arden-bound Levente Révész with Niels Koolen, who also competed with the team in the 2023 Formula Regional Middle East Championship.

Trident have recruited Owen Tangavelou, who raced with G4 Racing and Race Performance Motorsport in 2022, finishing 20th in the championship. He replaces Leonardo Fornaroli, who graduates to the Italian outfit's Formula 3 team after winning the rookie title in 2022. Nikhil Bohra will replace Tim Tramnitz to complete Trident's line-up after a successful Formula Regional debut in the 2023 Formula Regional Middle East Championship, where he finished 9th overall.

MP Motorsport signed Victor Bernier, who starts his second season in the championship after a 17th place finish in the 2022 season driving for MP's former partner team FA Racing.

Levente Révész makes the switch from Van Amersfoort Racing to Arden for his second FRECA season, replacing Noel León, who moves across to the Euroformula Open championship. Arden's driver roster is completed by Tom Lebbon, 2020 Ginetta Junior champion and third in GB3 in 2022, who replaces Dudu Barrichello.

RPM promote Irish driver Adam Fitzgerald from the F4 British Championship to replace the Trident-bound Owen Tangavelou. Santiago Ramos, who joined the team for the final round in 2022, will race there on a full-time basis in 2023. The teams' lineup will be completed by Macéo Capietto, who moves over from Monolite Racing after a 22nd place in his rookie season. He replaces fellow Frenchman Pierre-Louis Chovet, who moves over to GT3 racing after three years in Formula Regional.

Monolite Racing will field Giovanni Maschio, who graduates from the Italian F4 Championship, having also taken part in the 2023 Formula Regional Middle East Championship. Partnering him will be Enzo Scionti, who last drove for Drivex in the 2021 Euroformula Open Championship where he came 14th.

2022 French F4 champion Alessandro Giusti will make his Formula Regional debut in 2023, joining G4 Racing to replace Zagazeta.

KIC Motorsport will field an all-new, all-rookie line-up in 2023. Ferrari Academy driver Maya Weug jumps up to the Formula Regional level after two years in the Italian F4 Championship, replacing Santiago Ramos, who moves to RPM. Piotr Wiśnicki, who graduates to F3, is replaced by Ultimate Cup Series race winner Shannon Lugassy. The seat of Sebastian Ogaard, who moves to the newly created Eurocup-3 series, was originially to be filled by Formula Academy Finland race-winner Iker Oikarinen, before he was replaced by F4 racer Olexander Partyshev.

New entrant Saintéloc Racing signed Emerson Fittipaldi Jr., who will make the step up to Formula Regional in 2023. Partnering him will be Nicolás Baptiste, starting his second season in the championship after failing to score points with FA Racing in 2022.

Race calendar 
The calendar was revealed on 2 December 2022. Three pre-season tests will be held at Barcelona, Paul Ricard and Monza in March and April. The championship will visit Germany for the first time in its history, but will not support Formula One unlike in the years before.

Championship standings 

 Points system

Points will be awarded to the top 10 classified finishers.

Notes

References

External links 

 
 ACI Sport page

Formula Regional European Championship seasons
FREC
FREC
Formula Regional European Championship
FREC